The ground hornbills (Bucorvidae) are a family of the order Bucerotiformes, with a single genus Bucorvus and two extant species. The family is endemic to sub-Saharan Africa: the Abyssinian ground hornbill occurs in a belt from Senegal east to Ethiopia, and the southern ground hornbill occurs in southern and East Africa.

Ground hornbills are large, with adults around a metre tall. Both species are ground-dwelling, unlike other hornbills. Also unlike most other hornbills, they are carnivorous and feed on insects, snakes, other birds, amphibians and even tortoises. They are among the longest-lived of all birds, and the larger southern species is possibly the slowest-breeding (triennially) and longest-lived of all birds.

Taxonomy
The genus Bucorvus was introduced, originally as a subgenus, by the French naturalist René Lesson in 1830 with the Abyssinian ground hornbill Bucorvus abyssinicus as the type species. The generic name is derived from the name of the genus Buceros introduced by Carl Linnaeus in 1758 for the Asian hornbills where corvus is the Latin word for a "raven".

A molecular phylogenetic study published in 2013 found that the genus Bucorvus was sister to the rest of the hornbills.

The genus Bucorvus contains two species:

A prehistoric ground hornbill, Bucorvus brailloni, has been described from fossil bones in Morocco, suggesting that prior to Quaternary glaciations the genus was either much more widespread or differently distributed.

It is currently thought that the ground hornbills, along with Tockus and Tropicranus, are almost exclusively carnivorous and lack the gular pouch that allows other, less closely related hornbill genera to store fruit.

References

External links

Higher-level bird taxa restricted to the Afrotropics
Taxa named by René Lesson